The Gremlin (born Kondrati Topolov) is a fictional character appearing in American comic books published by Marvel Comics. He first appeared in The Incredible Hulk #163 (May 1973).

Although initially an adversary of the Hulk, the Gremlin is apparently killed in battle with Iron Man during the Armor Wars.

Concept and creation
Co-creator Steve Englehart recounted, "I’ve always treated the entire run of a book, up to the point that I took it over, as worthy of respect. So I was always interested in where series started out, and how they developed in their early days. The Gargoyle had indeed been in Hulk #1, so I thought it would be fun to connect to him—but I had to make something interesting for my time, not just wave at the past. I thought, ‘Gargoyle + Kremlin = Gremlin’."

Fictional character biography
Kondrati Topolov is the son of Russian scientist Yuri Topolov, also known as the Gargoyle, and is himself a mutant. Kondrati inherited his father's grotesque appearance and superhuman intelligence, although he was born disfigured unlike his father, who was mutated over time due to exposure to radioactive materials. His father was cured by a captured Bruce Banner using gamma rays and died killing other Soviets in an explosion. A brilliant scientist like his father, he created the high-tech gear used by the Soviet Super-Troopers (the immediate precursor to the Soviet Super-Soldiers), and for a time wore the Titanium Man power armor. He operated out of a secret base named Bitterfrost in Khystym, Siberia. He created a pet for himself named Droog, which was an intelligent, talking, Triceratops-like monster created through genetic engineering.

As the Gremlin, he first clashed with the Hulk at the Gremlin's secret base in the Arctic. Gremlin's men then captured General "Thunderbolt" Ross. The Hulk and General Ross later invaded the Gremlin's Bitterfrost base in Siberia to rescue the captured Major Glenn Talbot. The Gremlin and his pet Droog contended with the Hulk, but Bitterfrost was destroyed by S.H.I.E.L.D. Later, with the Soviet Super-Soldiers, Rom and Starshine, the Gremlin helped defeat the alien Dire Wraiths. The Gremlin then officially joined the Soviet Super-Soldiers.

The Gremlin next appeared as the second Titanium Man, wearing a new suit of the power armor he had originally created for Boris Bullsky. With the other Soviet Super-Soldiers, he contended with the X-Men and the Avengers in an attempt to capture Magneto. Later, the Gremlin fought Iron Man while wearing the Titanium Man armor during the "Armor Wars". Iron Man - despite using his weaker stealth armor - managed to defeat the Crimson Dynamo in the fight but was unable to neutralize the Gremlin, who destroyed Iron Man's negator pack. When the Gremlin grabbed Iron Man and the armored Avenger attempted to escape, his booster jets ignited the titanium armor. The Titanium Man armor exploded, apparently burning the Gremlin to death within it and forcing Iron Man to flee.

Powers and abilities
The Gremlin is a mutant who has inherited the immense intelligence of his father, the Gargoyle, where he gained it from an atomic accident. He had completed doctoral programs in various sciences and attained mastery over many areas of technology. Towards the end of his career, he wore the Titanium Man battlesuit that granted him tremendous strength, physical resistance, hypersonic flight, and the ability to utilize energy as weapons.

Other characters named Gremlin
 There was a Gremlin who appeared in Sub-Mariner #61. He is an agent of Doctor Hydro and one of his Hydro-Men where he hijacked an airplane that Namorita and Betty Dean Prentiss were on. The Gremlin used a disc which could hypnotize others.

References

Characters created by Steve Englehart
Comics characters introduced in 1973
Fictional characters with energy-manipulation abilities
Fictional characters with superhuman durability or invulnerability
Fictional Russian people
Fictional Soviet people
Marvel Comics characters with superhuman strength
Marvel Comics mutants
Marvel Comics scientists
Marvel Comics superheroes
Marvel Comics supervillains